The Ely Range is a mountain range located in Lincoln County, southeastern Nevada.

Ely Range was named after John H. Ely, a businessperson in the local mining industry.

References

Mountain ranges of Nevada
Mountain ranges of Lincoln County, Nevada